Nicolau I Misaki mia Nimi was the ruler of the Kingdom of Kongo as a member of the Kimpanzu house from 1752 until sometime after 1758, during the rotating houses period established by Pedro IV.

References

Manikongo of Kongo